{{Infobox animanga/Print
| type            = manga
| title           = 
| author          = Shaa
| publisher       = MediaWorks<br/ >ASCII Media Works
| publisher_en    =  Kadokawa 
| demographic     = Seinen
| imprint         = Dengeki Comics
| magazine        = Dengeki Teioh Dengeki G's Festival! Comic
| magazine_en     = Comic Walker '
| first           = November 2005
| last            = January 2012
| volumes         = 4
| volume_list     = #Volumes
}}

 is a Japanese manga series written and illustrated by Shaa, the same illustrator of the Haruka Nogizaka's Secret light novel series.  The manga was originally serialized in MediaWorks' Dengeki Teioh magazine, but after the magazine became defunct, it began serialization in Dengeki G's Festival! Comic, renamed . The manga was serialized in the two magazines between the November 2005 and January 2012 issues. A total of four tankōbon volumes were published under the Dengeki Comics imprint. Infinity Studios licensed Menacing Dog's in North America, and Menacing Dog's: Another Secret chapters are digitally serialized in English on Kadokawa's Comic Walker website.

Plot
Keiji Sendai has an image to maintain, as he is the school's most notorious delinquent. However, one day a klutzy and innocent girl called Setsuna Yatsusaki discovers his deepest and darkest secret, he is a hardcore otaku. Realizing his predicament, Setsuna knows he is willing to do anything to keep his secret. So she blackmails him into being her own slave, and tries to train him as her pet dog.

Characters

Keiji is the main protagonist of Menacing Dog's. He is a notorious delinquent, and is referred to as the "mad dog". Despite being a delinquent, he is also an otaku, though he tries his best to maintain his secret. This secret is found out by Setsuna, who then makes him her pet dog. Keiji appears in Haruka Nogizaka's Secret's PlayStation 2 visual novel.

Referred to as "faithful dog Hachiko". Setsuna is a cute and shy girl who is quite the klutz, but despite her innocent nature, she is slightly sadistic, blackmailing Keiji into being her pet dog when she discovers his secret. Setsuna makes cameo appearances in the Haruka Nogizaka's Secret anime, and PlayStation 2 visual novel.

Keiji's younger sister who attends kindergarten. Kei likes to tease her older brother.

The sister of Setsuna.

Three underlings of Keiji.

A geek in the same class as Keiji. He is a supporting character in Haruka Nogizaka's Secret.

Friend of Nobunaga. He is the main character in the Haruka Nogizaka's Secret series.

The homeroom teacher. She is a supporting character in Haruka Nogizaka's Secret.

Volumes
Menacing Dog's

Menacing Dog's: Another Secret

Merchandise
A figure of the character Setsuna was sculpted by an artist called Hatsumi, and produced by a company called Clayz. It was released in December 2006. Postcard collections featuring Menacing Dog's'' characters were also released.

References

External links
Menacing Dog's: Another Secret at Comic Walker

2005 manga
ASCII Media Works manga
Kadokawa Dwango franchises
Romantic comedy anime and manga
Infinity Studios titles
Seinen manga